The Toleman TG183 was a Formula One racing car designed by Rory Byrne and built and raced by Toleman Motorsport.

Design 
The TG183 was distinctive in that it had twin rear wings and front wing mounted radiators. Unfortunately the front wing configuration caused the front of the car to move about at high speed and was eventually replaced by a more conventional front wing set up.

Competition summary 
The car first raced in the last two races of the 1982 Formula One season driven by Derek Warwick. In the 1983 Formula One season an updated version of the car, designated TG183B, was introduced and Warwick was joined at Toleman by Bruno Giacomelli. The car also raced in the first four races of the 1984 Formula One season when Ayrton Senna made his debut in the Formula 1 championship alongside former FIM 350cc and Formula 750 motorcycle World Champion Johnny Cecotto from Venezuela.

The TG183B's last race meeting, the 1984 San Marino Grand Prix saw the only time that Ayrton Senna would fail to qualify for a Grand Prix. After a dispute with tyre supplier Pirelli which saw the team switch to Michelin, Toleman sat out the first day of qualifying rather than use the Italian rubber. In the second, wet qualifying session Senna's Hart 415T engine suffered a fuel pressure problem at the Tosa section of the Imola circuit, the furthest part of the track from the pits. He was unable to get back to the pits in time to record a time.

Complete Formula One World Championship results
(key)

 14 points scored in  using the Toleman TG184.

References

1983 Formula One season cars
1984 Formula One season cars
Toleman Formula One cars